Mustilia zolotuhini is a moth in the Endromidae family. It was described by Saldaitis and Ivinskis in 2015. It is found in China (Sichuan). The habitat consists of mixed mountain forests.

The wingspan is 46–51 mm. The forewings are dark yellowish-brown with a strongly reduced pattern of weakly semilunar submarginal fascia and blurred medial bands. There is a small, triangular brown discal spot and light bluish suffusion in the apical field, as well as brown obfuscation on the submarginal field. The hindwings are brighter than the forewings, with the costal field creamy yellow and the anal part darker with an indistinct brown transverse band. Adults have been recorded on wing from the end of August to October.

Etymology
The species is named for Russian lepidopterologist Vadim Zolotuhin.

References

Moths described in 2015
Mustilia
Moths of Asia